Digital Wellbeing is an initiative that Google proposed during its Google I/O event 2018 as an approach that will help users teach how to balance their Digital lives.

Digital Wellbeing tracks how much time you have spend on any particular application.

History 
Google's Digital Wellbeing was launched in 2018.

Features

Dashboard 
Dashboard shows how many apps you have opened and used in a day.

Bedtime mode 
by bedtime mode you can set when you have to go for sleep.

Focus mode 
By Focus mode you can prevent your mind from distracting applications. It helps you to do your study, work etc.

See also 

 List of Google products

External links 

 Official website

References 

Google software
Android (operating system) software